Playboys is a 1956 jazz album featuring trumpeter Chet Baker and saxophonist Art Pepper. The album was the third collaboration between Pepper and Baker, following The Route and Chet Baker Big Band. All three albums were recorded in 1956.

Cover
Playboys was reissued in 1961 under the name Picture of Heath after the fifth track (itself a reference to Jimmy Heath, composer of all but two of the tracks). The tracks themselves were presented in a slightly different order, starting with the new title track. Hugh Hefner reportedly objected to the original album cover (clearly inspired by Playboy magazine with its near-identical wordmark and pinup photo) and threatened to sue. For Picture of Heath, the original cover was replaced with a photo of the artists in the recording studio. The 1990 Blue Note/Pacific Jazz CD reissue of Playboys used the 'pin-up' cover, but the same label's 1998 CD reissue returned to the Picture of Heath cover.

Reception

Lindsay Planer of AllMusic stated: "These thoroughly enjoyable and often high-energy sides are perfect for bop connoisseurs as well as mainstream jazz listeners".

Track listing
All compositions by Jimmy Heath, except as indicated
 "For Minors Only" - 4:00
 "Minor-Yours " (Art Pepper) - 6:44
 "Resonant Emotions" - 5:41
 "Tynan Tyme" (Pepper) - 5:32
 "Picture of Heath" - 6:44
 "For Miles and Miles" - 6:25
 "C.T.A." - 5:12

1998 CD release
"Picture of Heath"
"For Miles and Miles "
"C.T.A. "
"For Minors Only"
"Minor Yours "
"Resonant Emotions"
"Tynan Tyme"

Personnel
Chet Baker — trumpet
Art Pepper — alto saxophone
Phil Urso — tenor saxophone
Carl Perkins — piano
Curtis Counce — bass
Larance Marable — drums

References 

1956 albums
Art Pepper albums
Chet Baker albums
Pacific Jazz Records albums
Albums recorded at Radio Recorders